Rupert Edward Algernon Campbell-Black is a fictional character in the Rutshire Chronicles series of romance novels written by Jilly Cooper.  He is the eighth-generation descendant of Rupert Black (who married Miss Campbell).  Campbell-Black's first appearance is in the novel Riders, which follows the lives and loves of a group of horse riders and show-jumpers. Although initially portrayed as a brutish, womanizing, adulterous cad, Campbell-Black's character is later somewhat redeemed through his triumphant winning of an Olympic gold medal for Great Britain. His loyalty is also highlighted through his friendships with Billy Lloyd-Foxe, Ricky France-Lynch and Declan O'Hara, as well as his gentle courtship of his second wife Agatha 'Taggie' O'Hara. He has five children: Marcus and Tabitha from his marriage with Helen Macaulay, adopted children Xavier and Bianca with Taggie, and the illegitimate Perdita.

Cooper has acknowledged that the character of Campbell-Black was inspired by David Somerset, 11th Duke of Beaufort, Andrew Parker Bowles, the former husband of Camilla, Queen Consort, and Michael Howard, 21st Earl of Suffolk.

In September 2016, Bantam Press published Mount! with the strap line 'Rupert Campbell-Black is back...'.

Appearances 

 Riders (1986 novel) and Riders (1993 film)
 Rivals (1988 novel)
 Polo (1991 novel)
 The Man Who Made Husbands Jealous (1993 novel and 1997 television miniseries)
 Appassionata (1996 novel)
 Score! (1999 novel)
 Pandora (2002 novel)
 Wicked! (2006 novel)
 Jump! (2010 novel)
 Mount! (2016 novel)

Notes

Fictional male sportspeople